Bulkin (from булка meaning a loaf of bread, a roll) is a Russian masculine surname, its feminine counterpart is Bulkina. It may refer to
Aleksandr Bulkin (born 1959), Soviet Olympic shooter
Bert R. Bulkin (1929–2012), American aeronautical engineer
Kelsey Bulkin (born 1985), singer and musician based in Los Angeles, California
Nadia Bulkin (born 1987), Indonesian-American political scientist and author
Aleksandr Bulkin(born 1995), Russian videobloger specialized in computer games and cars.
Alexander Z. Bulkin (born 1996), American attorney specializing in infrastructure and construction law.

Russian-language surnames